Sannantha angusta is a species of flowering plant in the family Myrtaceae, and is endemic to eastern Australia. It has scaly to fibrous bark, narrowly lance-shaped to linear leaves and white flowers, and usually grows in forest on rocky hillsides. It was previously known as Babingtonia angusta, and has been cultivated as Baeckea sp. 'Clarence River'.

Description
Its young stems are square in cross-section. Flowering occurs from November to March and the fruit is a woody capsule  in diameter.

Taxonomy and naming
This species was first formally described in 1999 by Anthony Bean who gave it the name Babingtonia angusta in the journal Austrobaileya from specimens he collected near Coutts Crossing in 1995. In 2007, Peter Gordon Wilson changed the name to Sannantha angusta in Australian Systematic Botany. It had previously been known as Baeckea sp. 'Clarence River', and was available under this name in the horticultural trade. The specific epithet (angusta) means "narrow", referring to the leaves of this species.

Distribution and habitat

References

angusta
Myrtales of Australia
Flora of New South Wales
Flora of Queensland
Plants described in 1999
Taxa named by Anthony Bean